Melissa Independent School District is a public school district based in Melissa, Texas (USA).

In addition to Melissa, the district serves a small portion of Weston and McKinney.

In 2009, the school district was rated "recognized" by the Texas Education Agency.

Schools

Melissa ISD has five academic campuses:

 Melissa High School (Grades 9-12)
 Melissa Middle School (Grades 6-8)
 Melissa Ridge Education Center (Grades Pre-K-Kindergarten)
 Harry McKillop Elementary School (Grades 1-5)
 North Creek Elementary School (Grades 1-5)

References

External links
 

School districts in Collin County, Texas